"You're Amazing" is a song by English vocalist Robert Palmer, which was released in 1990 as the second single from his tenth studio album Don't Explain. It was written by Steven Fellows, Alan Mansfield, Palmer, Guy Pratt and Steve Stevens, and produced by Palmer.

In the US, "You're Amazing" peaked at No. 28 on the Billboard Hot 100, and No. 5 on Billboard Top Rock Tracks chart. A music video was filmed to promote the single.

Critical reception
Upon release, Billboard commented: "Palmer's reliably strong soul stylings added to headbanger guitar riffs and sweet background harmonies proves to be a quirky, but potent, combination." In a retrospective review of Don't Explain, Paul Sinclair of Super Deluxe Edition listed the song as one of the album's "charmless excursions into heavy-ish rock".

Track listing
Cassette single
"You're Amazing" – 3:50
"So Emboldened" – 3:14

CD single (American promotional #1 – Remixed Version)
"You're Amazing" – 3:35

CD single (American promotional #2)
"You're Amazing" – 3:50

CD single (Japanese release)
"You're Amazing" – 3:50
"I'll Be Your Baby Tonight" – 3:26
"Deep End" – 4:32

Personnel 
 Robert Palmer – lead vocals, producer ("You're Amazing", "So Emboldened", "I'll Be Your Baby Tonight", "Deep End")
 Mike Fraser – mixing ("You're Amazing" – American promotional version)
 UB40 – producer ("Deep End")

Charts

References

1990 singles
Robert Palmer (singer) songs
Songs written by Robert Palmer (singer)
1990 songs
EMI America Records singles
Songs written by Steve Stevens